The 24 Karat Gold Tour was the seventeenth concert tour by American singer-songwriter and Fleetwood Mac vocalist Stevie Nicks. The tour was joined by special guest The Pretenders and it was launched in support of Nicks' 2014 studio album 24 Karat Gold: Songs from the Vault. The tour officially began on October 25, 2016 in Phoenix, Arizona at the Talking Stick Resort Arena, and it concluded on November 24, 2017 in Dunedin at the Forsyth Barr Stadium, lasting over one year.

Background
On September 6, 2016, Nicks announced a leg of 27 shows in North American with The Pretenders in support of her 2014 studio album, 24 Karat Gold: Songs from the Vault. Due to demand more dates were gradually added, including an entire second North America leg which was announced on December 5, 2016 that extended the tour into 2017. In 2017 Nicks also performed at various festivals in North America and appeared at British Summer Time in London, which was the sole European date of the tour. On August 10, 2017, Nicks announced a last leg of shows with The Pretenders in Australia and New Zealand. The final leg took place in November 2017 and concluded with a show at Forsyth Barr Stadium.

In July 2020, rumors began to spread about a possible concert video release after an official 24 Karat Gold Tour film screening event was posted online before being quickly deleted by cinema sites, possibly awaiting official announcement from Nicks' team. The listing read: "A concert performance by the woman with one of the most recognizable voices in music history. Stevie's string of hits songs as a solo artist and as a part of rock legends Fleetwood Mac has provided the soundtrack of our lives. Filmed over the last two shows of her solo tour including hits Edge of Seventeen, Rhiannon & Landslide and including cinema exclusive content of Stevie discussing personal moments with Tom Petty, Prince. (Subtitles: English, German, French, Italian) The event comes with the full support of the Stevie Nicks and the Fleetwood Mac teams and record labels." It is further speculated that film screenings were ultimately cancelled due to the ongoing COVID-19 pandemic. Shows in March 2017 were also professionally filmed and recorded according to concert-goers.

On September 10, 2020, it was announced that a live album of the 24 Karat Gold tour is to be released on vinyl, exclusively through Barnes & Noble on November 20, 2020.

Setlist
This set list is representative of the show on October 25, 2016, in Phoenix, Arizona. It does not represent all shows throughout the tour.

 "Gold and Braid"
 "If Anyone Falls"
 "Stop Draggin' My Heart Around"
 "Belle Fleur"
 "Outside the Rain"
 "Dreams"
 "Wild Heart"
 "Bella Donna"
 "Annabel Lee"
 "Enchanted"
 "New Orleans"
 "Starshine"
 "Moonlight (A Vampire's Dream)"
 "Stand Back"
 "Crying in the Night"
 "If You Were My Love"
 "Gold Dust Woman"
 "Edge of Seventeen"
Encore
 "Rhiannon"
 "Leather and Lace"

Shows

Notes

Personnel
 Stevie Nicks – vocals, tambourine
 Waddy Wachtel – guitars, musical director
 Ricky Peterson – hammond organ
 Scott Crago – drums
 Drew Hester – drums
 Darrell Smith – grand piano
 Al Ortiz – bass
  Carlos Rios – guitars
 Marilyn "Minnie" Martin – backup vocals
 Sharon Celani - backup vocals

References 

2016 concert tours
2017 concert tours
Stevie Nicks concert tours